Thomas Beattie (August 12, 1844 – December 2, 1914) was a Canadian politician.

Born in Saintfield, County Down, Ireland, Beattie emigrated to Canada with his parents in 1848. A businessman, he was a Major with the 7th Fusiliers of London, Ontario and served during the North-West Rebellion. He was Vice-President of London City Gas Company and a Director of the Agricultural Savings and Loan Company. He first entered politics as an alderman in London. He was first elected to the House of Commons of Canada in the 1896 federal election. A Conservative, he was defeated in the 1900 federal election but was re-elected in a 1907 by-election. He served until his death, aged 70, in 1914.

References

External links
 

1844 births
1914 deaths
People from Saintfield
Conservative Party of Canada (1867–1942) MPs
Irish emigrants to pre-Confederation Ontario
Members of the House of Commons of Canada from Ontario
Immigrants to the Province of Canada